Evan McGuire (born 1995 in Claregalway) is an Irish voice actor, athlete, drama player and music teacher.

McGuire made his debut in Arts when he acted as voice actor in the Oscar-nominated animation film The Secret of Kells. His voice gave shape to the protagonist "Brendan".

Evan McGuire is also an avid drama player and a qualified piano teacher.

During the "Powerade On Your Marks"-games in the Olympic Stadium in London, on 4 May 2012 he has set the first ever stadium record on the 100 metres. McGuire took part in the games under guidance of Derval O'Rourke.

References

External links 

Living people
1995 births
Irish male child actors
Irish male voice actors
Sportspeople from County Galway
Irish male sprinters